The 2011 WPS College Draft took place on January 14, 2011. It was the third college draft held by Women's Professional Soccer to assign the WPS rights of college players to the American-based teams.

Format
Official WPS release
 Western New York Flash select first and have an extra selection at the end of the first round
 The 2011 WPS Draft consists of four rounds and 24 picks overall.

Round 1

Round 2

Round 3

Round 4

Draft Notes
WPS transactions pages '09'10 '11

See also

2011
WPS Draft